Penicillium parmonense is a species of the genus of Penicillium.

References

parmonense
Fungi described in 1964